The Shanyang Formation is a geological formation in Shaanxi whose strata date back to the Late Cretaceous. Dinosaur remains are among the fossils that have been recovered from the formation.

Vertebrate paleofauna
 Shanyangosaurus niupanggouensis - "Partial sacrum, partial scapula, humeri, femur, tibia, metatarsals, [and] phalanges."
 Qinlingosaurus luonanensis
 Shantungosaurus cf giganteus

See also

 List of dinosaur-bearing rock formations

References

Geologic formations of China
Upper Cretaceous Series of Asia
Cretaceous China
Paleontology in Shaanxi